Odomchino is a rural locality (a village) in Mardengskoye Rural Settlement, Velikoustyugsky District, Vologda Oblast, Russia. Its population was 5 as of 2002.

Geography 
Odomchino is located 19 km southwest of Veliky Ustyug (the district's administrative centre) by road. Gremyachevo is the nearest rural locality.

References 

Rural localities in Velikoustyugsky District